Anchylobela nitens is a species of snout moth in the genus Anchylobela. It was described by Arthur Gardiner Butler in 1886, and is known from Australia.

References

Moths described in 1886
Anerastiini
Moths of Australia